Croick is a small crofting village, located in the right bank of the River Halladale in  Forsinard, eastern Sutherland, Scottish Highlands and is in the Scottish council area of Highland. The village has a population of 2,506.

References 

Populated places in Sutherland